John Goodwyn Barmby (Bapt. 12 November 1820 – 18 October 1881) was born at Yoxford in Suffolk and educated at Woodbridge School. He was an English Victorian utopian socialist thinker. He and his wife Catherine Barmby (1816/17–1853) were influential supporters of Robert Owen in the late 1830s and early 1840s before moving into the radical Unitarian stream of Christianity in the 1840s. Both had established reputations as staunch feminists and proposed the addition of women's suffrage to the demands of the Chartist movement.

Barmby was involved as an editor, writer, and organiser of communitarian ventures around London from 1838 to 1848. He is often associated with the growth of socialist and utopian projects during the rise of Chartism. He founded a utopian community on the Channel Islands and at times corresponded with radicals including William James Linton and Friedrich Engels.

Barmby also authored the first attested writing (1841) of communist in English; having translated it from communiste in French while claiming he first spoke the word in 1840 in Paris, France, the same year he went there to meet the advocates of le communisme as had been written in at least a French article and pamphlet by then, the former by Étienne Cabet and latter by both Théodore Dezamy and Jean-Jacques Pillot. By his claim, he first discussed "communism" with some followers of François-Noël Babeuf, describing them as "some of the most advanced minds of the French metropolis". He introduced Engels to the French communiste movement. They founded the London Communist Propaganda Society in 1841 and in the same year the Universal Communitarian Association. Barmby founded the Communist Chronicle, a monthly newspaper later published by Thomas Frost. By 1843, the Barmbys had recast their movement as a church. The term "communism" was used slightly later, but certainly by the 1840s. As Donald F. Busky wrote, "Barmby may have thought that he invented the words communism and communist, but he was mistaken ... [I]n all probability [communist and communism were in use] by the 1830s or 1840s".

Researchers at Rutgers University explain:

Disillusioned with communism, Barmby became involved with Unitarianism in 1848. After leading congregations at Southampton, Topsham, Lympstone and Lancaster, he was minister of Wakefield Unitarian Chapel from 1858 to 1879. He continued to contribute to liberal politics and published poetry and hymns.

References

Further reading 
 Barbara Taylor (1983). Eve and the New Jerusalem. pp. 172–182.

1820 births
1881 deaths
19th-century Christian universalists
19th-century English clergy
Chartists
British cooperative organizers
English Christian socialists
English Christian universalists
English feminists
Male feminists
Owenites
Unitarian clergy
Unitarian socialists
Utopian socialists
People educated at Woodbridge School